Pavê is a Brazilian dessert that consists of alternating layers of biscuits (ladyfingers or corn starch biscuits) and a cream made using condensed milk. It is similar in structure to the tiramisu.

Generally, recipes involve heating condensed milk and milk, and stirring the mixture until it thickens. Then, layers of milk-soaked biscuits are placed into a container alternating with layers of the creamy mixture. Additionally, pavês can be made of many different flavors, such as chocolate, dulce de leche, peanut, or fruits such as strawberries, pineapples, lemons and peaches.

Etymology 
The word pavê is said to have come from the French word , meaning cobblestone pavement. This likely refers to the layout of each of the biscuit layers in the pavê.

History 
The origins of pavê are uncertain. However, it was created prior to the tiramisu, as the latter was invented in the late 1960s, and recipes of pavê can be found as early as 1937. Brazilian recipes of refrigerated dairy desserts consisting of alternating layers of soaked ladyfingers and creamy mixtures can be found as early as 1917, although not called "pavê" at the time, but instead "pudding" or simply "cream".

In the 1970s, a peanut variant of pavê was reportedly popular.

A common pun relating to the dessert (in Brazil, referred to as an uncle joke) is "". It is a play on words on the colloquial reduction of "" (meaning 'to look at') to "", similar in sound to pavê. The joke means, simultaneously, "is [the dessert] to look at, or to eat?" and "is [the dessert] pavê, or to eat?".

Gallery

See also 
 Tiramisu
 Trifle
 List of Brazilian sweets and desserts

References 

Brazilian desserts